Lončarić is a Croatian surname. The surname may refer to:

 Filip Lončarić (1986–), Croatian professional football goalkeeper
 Marija Planić-Lončarić (1933–1992), Croatian art historian
 Mijo Lončarić (1941–), Croatian linguist
 Sandra Lončarić (1974–), Croatian actress
 Zvonimir Lončarić (1927–2004), Croatian sculptor and painter.
 Nenad Lončarić (1972–), Croatian rally driver.

Croatian surnames